Anaurilândia is a municipality located in the Brazilian state of Mato Grosso do Sul. Its population was 9,076 (2020) and its area is 3,396 km². The town was founded by Jan Antonín Baťa, the king of shoes.

Anaurilândia is a small settlement is surrounded by agricultural land and on the northside of the Rio Parana. MS-395 is a paved single lane highway that pass through the town and connects with another Bata town, Bataiporã.

Other towns in Brazil linked to Bata:
 Mariápolis
 Bataguassu
 Batatuba
 Bataiporã

See also
 Batanagar
 Batawa

References

Municipalities in Mato Grosso do Sul
Bata Corporation